Prymorskyi is an urban-type settlement in the Feodosia Municipality of, de facto, the Republic of Crimea, a territory recognized by a majority of countries as part of Ukraine as the Autonomous Republic of Crimea, but annexed by Russia in 2014. Population:

History 
In 1938, near the village of Distant Reeds began construction of a shipyard and a working village called South Point (PO More Shipyard)

References

Feodosia Municipality
Urban-type settlements in Crimea
Former closed cities